The Patasola or "one leg" is one of many legends in South American folklore about female monsters from the jungle, appearing to male hunters or loggers in the middle of the wilderness when they think about women. The Patasola appears in the form of a beautiful and seductive woman, often in the likeness of a loved one, who lures a man away from his companions deep into the jungle.  There, the Patasola reveals her true, hideous appearance as a one-legged creature with ferocious vampire-like lust for human flesh and blood, attacking and devouring the flesh or sucking the blood of her victims.

Location
The Patasola derives from vampire legend.  According to popular belief, she inhabits mountain ranges, virgin forests, and other heavily wooded or jungle-like areas.  At the edges of these places, and primarily at night, she lures male hunters, loggers, miners, millers, and animal herders.  She also interferes with their daily activities. She blocks shortcuts through the jungle, disorients hunters, and throws hunting dogs off the scent of their game. The Patasola is usually regarded as protective of nature and the forest animals and unforgiving when humans enter their domains to alter or destroy them.
 
Additionally, the exact name and attributes of the myth vary according to region. For example, a creature similar to La Patasola is called La Tunda in the Colombian Pacific Coast region. Other mythical creatures similar in description to La Patasola but differing in name are found throughout Latin America (see Variations).

Physical description
La Patasola's most notable feature, from which her name derives, is her one leg. She is believed to possess only one leg, which terminates in a cleaved bovine-like hoof and moves in a plantigrade fashion. Despite only possessing one leg, La Patasola can move swiftly through the jungle. In her natural state, La Patasola has a terrifying appearance; she is described as possessing one breast, bulging eyes, catlike fangs, a hooked nose, and big lips.
 
La Patasola can metamorphose into different shapes and appearances. She commonly takes on the appearance of a beautiful woman to lure men to their death. She then uses her feline-type fangs to suck the blood from her victims. It is also believed that she can transform into other animals, materializing as a large black dog or cow.
 
According to Javier Ocampo Lopez, when pleased, La Patasola climbs to the top of a tree or mountain and sings the following song:
"I'm more than the siren /
I live alone in the world: /
and no one can resist me /
because I am the Patasola. /
On the road, at home, /
on the mountain and the river, /
in the air and in the clouds /
all that exists is mine."

Mythical origins
La Patasola's origin story varies, but usually follows the pattern of a scorned, unfaithful, or otherwise "bad" woman. Some believe that she was a mother who killed her own son, and was then banished to the woods as punishment. Others believe that she was a wicked temptress who was cruel to both men and women, and for this reason they mutilated her with an axe, chopping off one leg and throwing it into a fire. She then died of her injuries and now haunts the forests and mountain ranges. In a third origin story, she was an unfaithful wife who cheated on her husband with the couple's employer, a patron. Upon discovering her infidelity, the jealous husband murdered both her and the patron. She died but her soul remains in a one-legged body.

Variations
More common in Colombian folklore, they are similar to the Sayona (Venezuela), the Tunda (Colombian Pacific), and the Madremonte or Marimonda (Colombia).
 
The La Tunda myth of the Colombian Pacific region also tells of a vicious woman who sucks the blood of men. However, in this legend, "La Tunda's shape-shifting abilities are far from perfect…for whatever form she assumes will invariably have a wooden leg in the shape of a molinillo (wooden whisk). The monster, however, is very cunning, and is adept at concealing this defect from would-be victims."
 
Mythical creatures with similar origin stories are found as far north of Colombia as Mexico; La Llorona (The Weeping Woman) is said to roam the streets moaning for her children, whom she killed.
 
Similar in behavior to La Patasola is "Matlacihua, a phantasm in the beautiful and svelte form of a woman dressed in white. Sometimes called the White Lady or the Bride, she would appear at night and with her seductive songs and irresistible beauty, lure men of bad conduct into the forest, scaring them half to death." Though not described as sucking the blood of her victims, the White Lady supposedly deterred men from seeking amorous relations in the woods, jungles, or mountain ranges.

See also
Caipora
Chullachaqui
Deer Woman
Fiura
Llorona
Marimonda
Mohan (legendary)
Monopod (creature)
Nasnas
Sayona
Sihuanaba, a similar figure from Central America
Tulevieja
Tunda
Vengeful ghost

References

Spanish-language South American legendary creatures
South American mythology
Indigenous topics of the Amazon
Female legendary creatures
Vampires
Legendary creatures with absent body parts
Nature spirits
Shapeshifting